Nine Ashes is a hamlet in the High Ongar civil parish of the Epping Forest District of Essex, England. The hamlet, a linear development along Nine Ashes Road, is less than 1 mile south from the Harlow to Chelmsford A414 road. Nearby settlements including the village of Norton Heath and the hamlet of King Street.

References 
A-Z Essex (page 68)

External links

Epping Forest District
Hamlets in Essex